Cannon Lake (formerly Skymont) is Intel's codename for the 10 nm die shrink of the Kaby Lake microarchitecture. As a die shrink, Cannon Lake is a new process in Intel's process-architecture-optimization execution plan as the next step in semiconductor fabrication. Cannon Lake CPUs are the first mainstream CPUs to include the AVX-512 instruction set.

Prior to Cannon Lake's launch, Intel launched another 14 nm process refinement with the codename Coffee Lake.

The successor of Cannon Lake is Ice Lake, powered by the Sunny Cove microarchitecture, which represents the architecture phase in the process-architecture-optimization model.

Design history and features 

Cannon Lake was initially expected to be released in 2015/2016, but the release was pushed back to 2018. Intel demonstrated a laptop with an unknown Cannon Lake CPU at CES 2017 and announced that Cannon Lake based products would be available in 2018 at the earliest.

At CES 2018 Intel announced that it had started shipping mobile Cannon Lake CPUs at the end of 2017 and would ramp up production in 2018.

On April 26, 2018 in its report on first-quarter 2018 financial results, Intel stated it was currently shipping low-volume 10 nm product and expects 10 nm volume production to shift to 2019. In July 2018, Intel announced that volume production of Cannon Lake would be delayed yet again, to late Q2 2019.

The first laptop featuring a Cannon Lake CPU, namely Intel Core i3-8121U, a dual core CPU with Hyper-Threading and Turbo Boost but without an integrated GPU, was released in May 2018 in very limited quantities.

On August 16, 2018 Intel announced two new models of NUCs would use the 10 nm Cannon Lake-U i3-8121U CPU. These models later became more readily available at retail in late November 2018.

On October 28, 2019, Intel announced that it will be discontinuing the i3-8121U and the Cannon Lake-powered Crimson Canyon NUC, with orders being taken till December 27, and shipping till February 28, 2020, making Cannon Lake not only one of the shortest-lived microarchitectures of Intel, but also the shortest-lived 10 nm x86 CPU microarchitecture (with only one CPU model to be released and manufactured for 1.5 years).

In July 2021, Intel announced it would be removing support for Cannon Lake graphics in their Linux kernel driver, effective as of Linux 5.15, as no production Cannon Lake CPUs were shipped with graphics enabled; this removal resulted in a reduction of approximately 1,600 lines of code.

Improvements 
 Intel Palm Cove CPU cores
 AVX-512 instruction set extension
 Intel's first 10 nm process technology

Products

Mobile processors

Cannon Lake-U

See also 
 List of Intel CPU microarchitectures

References 

Intel products
Intel microarchitectures
Transactional memory
X86 microarchitectures